Village Lake, previously named Alcohol and Drug Abuse Lake, is a reservoir in Richland County, South Carolina, United States. Construction of the reservoir was finished in 1973. The  lake is on a tributary of the Crane Creek River.

The lake is believed to be named after a place called Morris Village, a nearby residential treatment center for people with substance dependence. Before 2022, its owner, the South Carolina Department of Mental Health, used the name "the pond at Morris Village", sometimes "Morris Village Pond" or the "Village Lake".  On June 9, 2022, the lake was officially renamed to Village Lake. Because of its location, it is fenced and not open to the public.

See also
 List of lakes in South Carolina
 Place names considered unusual

References

Bodies of water of Richland County, South Carolina
Reservoirs in South Carolina
Buildings and structures completed in 1973
1973 establishments in South Carolina